World Peace Is None of Your Business is the tenth solo studio album by English singer Morrissey, recorded in February 2014 and released on 15 July 2014. It was produced by Joe Chiccarelli and was distributed by record label Harvest. The album entered at number 2 on the UK Albums Chart and peaked in the US at number 14 on the Billboard 200.

Recording and cover
World Peace Is None of Your Business was recorded at La Fabrique in Saint-Rémy-de-Provence in France during February 2014 in a studio where Nick Cave had also worked.

The album's cover features an image of Morrissey crouching down and offering a pen to a chocolate Labrador.

Promotion
The album's lead single, "World Peace Is None of Your Business", was released on 13 May 2014, alongside an accompanying music video featuring Nancy Sinatra next to Morrissey performing the song in spoken word. On 20 May a second spoken word video was then released for the album's second single, "Istanbul". Purchasers who pre-ordered the album received a free mp3 download of the song. On 3 June the digital download and spoken word video for the third single, "Earth Is the Loneliest Planet", was made available. The video features Pamela Anderson. On 17 June the studio version and spoken word video of "The Bullfighter Dies", the fourth single, was put on Morrissey's official YouTube channel. The spoken word video had previously leaked online on 18 May. In addition to the four singles, "Kick the Bride Down the Aisle" debuted live prior to the album's official release.

On 7 July 2014 a four-track 10" vinyl EP was released, featuring the four singles, for Record Store Day.

Release and promotion
World Peace Is None of Your Business was released on 15 July 2014 by record label Harvest.

A Deluxe Edition was also released with more material. Of these other tracks, "Scandinavia" had been played live many times in 2011 and 2012, and also performed as part of the Studio in Session bonus feature on the 25Live DVD and Blu-ray release. "Art-hounds" had been played live only once, on 7 August 2011. The four spoken word videos are available in audio form on a Japanese deluxe version, as well as the other 18 tracks.

In 2021, Morrissey himself appeared to rank the album as the best of his career.

Harvest Records controversy
On 20 August 2014 Morrissey announced that, due to disagreements with his record label Harvest, the album would be dropped only three weeks after its release.

On 8 January 2015, Morrissey advised fans that a 45 of "The Bullfighter Dies" was scheduled for a global release by Harvest, but was scrapped by Steve Barnett at the last minute. The B-side was to be the original French mix of the song "One of Our Own". Further vinyl singles, including "Istanbul", "Kiss Me A Lot" and "Neal Cassady Drops Dead" were to include other French mixes of several songs as their B-sides: "Scandinavia", "Smiler With Knife" and "Art-hounds", and were available to pre-order from amazon.fr. However, these were also presumably scrapped. The album was still officially available for digital download via online music stores; but stopped getting supported after the drop.

Reception

At Metacritic, which assigns a weighted average score out of 100 to reviews and ratings from mainstream critics, the album has received a metascore of 70, based on 36 reviews which indicates 'Generally favorable reviews".

In political magazine National Review and in a review titled "World Summit" Armond White wrote that "Morrissey challenges pop and political orthodoxies."  Alexis Petridis concluded a four of five star review for The Guardian with "Not as great as you might have hoped, but far better than you might have feared, a little more reliant on others than a man who ended his Autobiography claiming that "I have never had anything in my life that I did not make for myself" might care to admit, World Peace Is None of Your Business may be as good as it gets at this stage in his career, which is good enough." In a more mixed review for Clash Magazine Benji Taylor wrote "though the bleakly beautiful is still there, the flashes are sporadic." Pitchfork gave an average rating saying, "At times the intricate arrangements come across as a means of covering up unmemorable songwriting". In Truck & Driver's regular music reviews, Shaun Connors concluded one of five star assessment with "Lyrically, with his self-absorbed anti-views so all-prevalent in the alternative universe Morrissey inhabits, is it any surprise this collection of rants to [bad] music covers such cheerful events as a bullfighter dying and a student’s suicide? Maybe the latter listened to this
album once too often…"

Track listing

Personnel
 Morrissey – lead vocals

Additional personnel
 Boz Boorer – guitar, QChord, clarinet, sax
 Jesse Tobias – guitars
 Solomon Walker – bass guitar
 Matt Walker – drums, tubular bells, percussion
 Gustavo Manzur – keyboards, piano, organ, synths, trumpet, accordion, flamenco guitar, didgeridoo, QChord, backing vocals
 Kristeen Young – backing vocals

Technical
 Joe Chiccarelli – production, mixing
 Ken Sluiter – mixing
 Bob Ludwig – mastering

Charts

Weekly charts

Year-end charts

Certifications and sales

! scope="row" | United States 
|  || 25,000
|}

References

External links
 Official site for World Peace Is None of Your Business
 Morrissey on MyPlayDirect

2014 albums
Morrissey albums
Harvest Records albums
Albums produced by Joe Chiccarelli